Everybody Loves Urusei Yatsura is the last album by Scottish indie rock Urusei Yatsura, released in 2000.

The track "Thank You" is noted for containing ZX Spectrum BASIC code, which displays a red background reading "Hail Satan, Lick His Cloven Hoof". The program also contains a comment of "What is sadder a) finding this b) writing it?".

Track listing

References

2000 albums
Urusei Yatsura (band) albums
Vinyl data